The Battle of Ngasaunggyan was fought in 1277 between the Yuan dynasty of China and the Pagan Kingdom of Burma led by Narathihapate. The battle was initiated by Narathihapate, who invaded Yunnan, a province of the Yuan dynasty. Yuan defenders soundly defeated the Pagan forces.

Prelude 
Hostility between the two empires had already been established by that time. When Kublai Khan had sent emissaries to regional powers of eastern Asia to demand tribute, Narathihapate refused the Khan's representatives the first time they visited in 1271. A later tribute mission ended up with the Mongol envoys being killed by bandits in 1273. When Kublai Khan did not immediately respond to this insult, Narathihapate gained confidence that the Yuan would attack him.

Battle 
In 1277, Narathihapate subsequently invaded the state of Kaungai, whose chief had recently pledged fealty to Kublai Khan. Local garrisons of Yuan troops were ordered to defend the area, and although outnumbered were able to soundly defeat the Pagan forces in battle.  

The Burmese attack was led by their war elephants, which caused initial difficulty to the horse archer-based Yuan army, as their ponies became uncontrollable in the presence of the grey beast.  However the Yuan general Khudu (Qutuq) calmly ordered his men to dismount and tether their horses in a nearby woods, and fight as foot archers instead. The showers of Mongol arrows so badly wounded the elephants that they fled back in panic and trampled their own troops. Seeing this the Yuan troops immediately remounted and charged down upon the shaken Burmese infantry, first pouring arrows into their ranks and then closing into melee with sabers and maces.  Eventually the Pagan troops were routed and then vigorously pursued, resulting in a comprehensive Yuan victory.

After the battle the Mongols pressed on with an offensive into the Pagan territory of Bhamo.  In the end however they had to abandon their invasion and return to Yunnan after Khudu was wounded.

Aftermath 
In the end of 1277, Yunnan governor's son Naser al-Din attacked Bhamo again and tried to establish a postal system. However, deadly heat forced him to leave Burma. He returned to Khanbaliq with 12 elephants and gave them to Kublai Khan in 1279.

The Battle of Ngassaunggyan was the first of three decisive battles between the two empires, the others being the Battle of Bhamo in 1283 and the Battle of Pagan in 1287. By the end of these battles, the Yuan dynasty had conquered the entire Pagan Kingdom and installed a puppet government.

The battle was later reported back to Europe by Marco Polo, who described the battle vividly in his reports. His description was presumably pieced together by accounts he heard while visiting the court of Kublai Khan.

References

Further reading
Hall, D.G.E. (1960). Burma. Hutchinson & Co.: London. Third edition.

External links
Wars Myanmars Fought (Retrieved May 23, 2005)

Ngasaunggyan
13th century in Burma
Ngasaunggyan
1277 in the Mongol Empire
Wars involving Imperial China
Ngasaunggyan